Cymatura is a genus of longhorn beetles of the subfamily Lamiinae, containing the following species:

 Cymatura albomaculata Breuning, 1950
 Cymatura bifasciata Gerstäcker, 1855
 Cymatura bizonata Quedenfeldt, 1881
 Cymatura brittoni Franz, 1954
 Cymatura fasciata (Guérin-Meneville, 1849)
 Cymatura holonigra Breuning, 1954
 Cymatura itzingeri Breuning, 1935
 Cymatura mabokensis Breuning & Teocchi, 1973
 Cymatura manowi Franz, 1954
 Cymatura mechowi Quednfeldt, 1882
 Cymatura mucorea Fairmaire, 1887
 Cymatura nigra Franz, 1954
 Cymatura nyassica Breuning, 1935
 Cymatura orientalis (Breuning, 1968)
 Cymatura spumans (Guérin-Meneville, 1847)
 Cymatura strandi Breuning, 1935
 Cymatura tarsalis Aurivillius, 1914
 Cymatura wallabergeri Adlbauer, 1994

References

Xylorhizini